Charlie Kent Woerner (born October 16, 1997) is an American football tight end for the San Francisco 49ers of the National Football League (NFL). He played college football at Georgia, and was drafted by the 49ers in the sixth round of the 2020 NFL Draft.

College career
After playing at Rabun County High School, Woerner played at Georgia, never seeing the field consistently and mainly being used as a blocking tight end.

Professional career 

Woerner was drafted by the San Francisco 49ers in the sixth round with the 190th overall pick in the 2020 NFL Draft. The 49ers previously acquired this pick after trading wide receiver Marquise Goodwin to the Philadelphia Eagles. Woerner was placed on the reserve/COVID-19 list by the 49ers on December 19, 2020, and activated on December 29.

Personal life
He is the nephew of former NFL safety Scott Woerner. Woerner won a state championship in discus during his senior year of high school. His father Kent Woerner played football at Furman University in Greenville, SC.

References

External links
San Francisco 49ers bio
Georgia Bulldogs bio

1997 births
People from Rabun County, Georgia
Players of American football from Georgia (U.S. state)
American football tight ends
Georgia Bulldogs football players
San Francisco 49ers players
Living people